Marco Antonio Barrientos Zumpano, known as Marco Barrientos (born June 28, 1963) is an Evangelical Christian musician, pastor, author, teacher, and speaker known for combining practical biblical principles with the flow of prophetic songs.

Barrientos has an extensive discography, and is best known for his productions "Sin Reservas", "Es Hora de Adorarle", "Transformados", and "Ilumina".

He has been nominated for the Arpa Awards in many times and Latin Grammy Awards three times, for Best Christian Album for his productions "Viento + Fuego" in 2005, "Transformados" in 2011, and "Amanece" in 2015.

Early life and education
Barrientos was born in Mexico. He graduated from Christ for the Nations Bible Institute in 1985.

Ministry
Since his graduation, he has been in full-time ministry, beginning as associate pastor of "Amistad Cristiana" in Mexico City. He remained there for 13 years, and then he founded the ministry "Amistad Cristiana Internacional" and the music label "Aliento Producciones", in which he is president.

Barrientos has 30 recordings of praise and worship, and is the author of different books such as, "El plan de Dios para ti" (God's plan for you) and "Muéstrame Tu Gloria" (Show Me Your Glory). He travels extensively, carrying the conference "Aliento del Cielo" throughout the world and more recently to ELAM, "Escuela de Líderes y Artes del Ministerio" (School of Leadership and Art of Ministry). In 2004, he and his wife began the church "Centro Internacional Aliento" in Dallas, Texas.

He is also the director and host of "Avívanos", (Revive us) an annual worship conference part of Amistad Cristiana Internacional, Inc.

Discography
 1986 Es El Día de Alabanza
 1988 Se Exaltado
 1989 Por Siempre Señor
 1990 Príncipe de Paz
 1991 A La Batalla
 1992 En Ti
 1992 Delante De Tu Trono
 1992 Un Día En Tu Presencia
 1993 No Puedo Parar De Alabarte
 1994 Tú Eres Señor
 1995 Clamor De Guerra
 1995 Poderoso Dios
 1995 Espíritu Santo y Fuego
 1996 Río Poderoso
 1997 Aliento Del Cielo
 1997 Mas De Ti
 1997 No Hay Nadie Como Tu
 1998 Una Vida De Alabanza
 1999 Luz A Las Naciones
 1999 Sin Reservas
 2000 Homenaje a Jesús
 2000 Es Hora De Adorarle
 2001 Clamemos A Jesús
 2002 Yo Soy Amor
 2002 Venga Tu Reino
 2003 Es Por Tu Gracia
 2003 Yo Soy Tu Sanador
 2003 Muéstrame Tu Gloria
 2004 Yo Soy Tu Paz
 2004 Viento + Fuego
 2005 Yo Soy Tu Padre
 2005 Gozo En Tu Presencia
 2006 Joy in Your Presence
 2006 Yo Soy Tu Consolador
 2006 Levántate y Resplandece
 2007 Yo Soy Tu Luz
 2007 Cree, Todo Es Posible
 2008 Yo Soy Tu Libertador
 2008 Avívanos
 2009 Descansa En Mi
 2009 Yo Soy Tu Esperanza
 2009 Momentos En Tu Presencia
 2009 En Vivo Desde El Auditorio Nacional
 2010 Intimo
 2010 Transformados
 2011 Momentos Espontáneos
 2012 Ilumina
 2012 Global Project (Español)
 2014 Amanece
 2016 El Encuentro
 2016 Legado de Adoración
 2017 Encuentros con Dios
 2020 Amor Inagotable

Bibliography 

 2000 El plan de Dios para ti 
 2004 Muéstrame tu gloria 
 2005 Viento más fuego 
 2008 ¡Cree, todo es posible!

References

External links 
 Salmista.org Marco Barrientos
 Aliento Music School

Mexican performers of Christian music
20th-century Mexican male singers
1963 births
English-language singers from Mexico
Spanish-language singers
Living people
Mexican evangelicals
Singers from Mexico City
Performers of contemporary Christian music
21st-century Mexican male singers